Sergio Mauricio Villegas Sánchez (born 2 October 1973) is a Chilean former footballer who played as a midfielder for clubs in Chile and Venezuela.

Career
A product of Colo-Colo youth system, Villegas made his debut in the 1991 Copa Chile. At league level, he made six appearances in 1996.

In his homeland, he also played for Ñublense, Deportes Puerto Montt, O'Higgins, where he came alongside Carlos Vega, with whom he also coincided in Colo-Colo and Deportes Puerto Montt, and Coquimbo Unido, where he retired in 2001.

Abroad, he played for Venezuelan side Minervén in 1998.

International career
Villegas represented Chile at under-20 level in the 1992 South American Championship, alongside players such as Francisco Rojas, Marcelo Salas and Clarence Acuña.

After football

References

External links
 

1973 births
Living people
Chilean footballers
Chilean expatriate footballers
Chile under-20 international footballers
Colo-Colo footballers
Ñublense footballers
Puerto Montt footballers
Minervén S.C. players
O'Higgins F.C. footballers
Coquimbo Unido footballers
Chilean Primera División players
Primera B de Chile players
Venezuelan Primera División players
Chilean expatriate sportspeople in Venezuela
Expatriate footballers in Venezuela
Association football midfielders
Place of birth missing (living people)